Antipterna homopasta is a species of moth in the family Oecophoridae, first described by Alfred Jefferis Turner in 1932 as Periallactis homopasta. The species epithet, homopasta, derives from the Greek, όμοπαστος ("uniformly sprinkled").  The male holotype for Periallactis homopasta was collected at Crows Nest in Queensland.

References

Further reading 
 

Oecophorinae
Taxa described in 1932
Taxa named by Alfred Jefferis Turner